The following highways are numbered 483:

Brazil
SP-483

Ireland
 R483 regional road

Japan
 Japan National Route 483

United States
  Florida State Road 483
  County Road 483 (Volusia County, Florida)
  Louisiana Highway 483
  Puerto Rico Highway 483